Josep Yxart (1852–1895) was a Spanish literary critic, essayist and translator from Tarragona, Catalonia. He was an important figure in the Renaixença movement. 

He translated to Spanish works by Friedrich von Schiller. Joan Sardà i Lloret and Narcís Oller were his pupils, and he also encouraged Joan Maragall, Santiago Rusiñol and Raimon Casellas to write.

Works
 Lo teatre català. Assaig històric-crític (1878)
 Fortuny (1881)
 El arte escénico en España (1894-1896)
 Obres catalanes de Josep Ixart (1896), compilation by Narcís Oller

External links
 Yxart - lletrA 

Spanish literary critics
German–Catalan translators
German–Spanish translators
Spanish male writers
Catalan-language writers
1852 births
1895 deaths
19th-century translators
19th-century male writers
Spanish–Catalan translators